Coronation Street is a British soap opera first broadcast on Friday 9 December 1960. The following is a list of characters that first appeared in 2013, by order of first appearance. All characters were introduced by series producer, Phil Collinson or his successor, Stuart Blackburn. Faye Windass' (Ellie Leach) biological father, Tim Metcalfe (Joe Duttine), arrived in January, while Katy Armstrong's (Georgia May Foote) best friend, Steph Britton (Tisha Merry), and Gloria Price's (Sue Johnston) new fiancé, Eric Babbage (Timothy West), made their debuts in February. In April, former Waterloo Road actress Katie McGlynn joined the cast as Beth Tinker's (Lisa George) niece, Sinead. The year's first baby, Jake Windass, son of Gary Windass (Mikey North) and Izzy Armstrong (Cherylee Houston) born out of surrogacy through Tina McIntyre (Michelle Keegan), arrived in May. He was followed by Lily Platt, David (Jack P. Shepherd) and Kylie Platt's (Paula Lane) baby daughter, in August. September saw the arrival of Faye's devious new friend, Grace Piper (Ella-Grace Gregoire). October delivered the introduction of Owen's old acquaintance-turned-business partner Pat Phelan (Connor McIntyre), who would gradually become one of the show's greatest characters and is arguably the most notorious villain in the show's history. Gary's old friend from the army Kal Nazir (Jimi Mistry), Dennis Tanner's (Philip Lowrie) acquaintance Ritchie de Vries (Robin Askwith), Steve McDonald's (Simon Gregson) friend from History class Andrea Beckett (Hayley Tamaddon) and a new love interest for Sophie Webster (Brooke Vincent), Maddie Heath (Amy James-Kelly), made their first appearances in December.

Tim Metcalfe

Tim Metcalfe, played by Joe Duttine, made his first screen appearance on 21 January 2013. Tim is the biological father of Faye Windass (Ellie Leach). The character was revealed to be entering the show in August 2012 by series producer, Phil Collinson. He stated "We know that Faye's mother is dead, but there's a father out there somewhere and he's going to come along and challenge things for Anna." On 13 January 2013, it was announced that Duttine had been cast in the role of Tim.

Steph Britton

Steph Britton, played by Tisha Merry, made her first screen appearance on 18 February 2013. In November 2016, it was announced that Merry would be leaving Coronation Street after nearly four years on the show and quitting the role as Steph. The announcement came a few months after her co-star Oliver Farnworth announced his departure who plays her on-screen boyfriend, Andy Carver, she made her last appearance on 20 January 2017. In December 2017 it was announced that Merry would reprise the role for a handful of episodes in early 2018 and Steph returned from 31 January to 7 February.

Steph arrives in Coronation Street alongside Megan Smithson (Amy Dolan) to visit their friend Katy Armstrong (Georgia May Foote). They meet to discuss Steph's upcoming 18th birthday party at The Bistro. During the party, both Steph and Megan flirt with Ryan Connor (Sol Heras). Steph later "makes a play for Ryan", making Katy jealous. In November 2013, Steph gets a job at the Bistro as a waitress and makes a good impression on Gloria Price (Sue Johnston) and Gail Platt (Helen Worth). In March 2014, Steph's brother Luke (Dean Fagan) arrived on the Street and started working at the garage with Tyrone Dobbs (Alan Halsall).

Steph becomes good friends with her flatmate Tina McIntyre (Michelle Keegan) and serves as a confidante when she is struggling during her affair with Peter Barlow (Chris Gascoyne). Steph tries to convince Tina that Peter isn't worth it but she won't listen. She is devastated when Tina is pushed off a balcony and beaten with a metal pipe by Rob Donovan (Marc Baylis), and visits her in hospital. She is distraught when Tina later dies from her injuries.

At the end of 2014, Steph enters a relationship with Andy Carver, who is pretending to be the son of Michael Rodwell (Les Dennis). She discovers Andy's secret, however, she stands by him and supports him as they both love each other. However, the real Gavin Rodwell (Mark Holgate) soon arrives in Weatherfield and demands a large amount of money from Andy and Steph for him to keep silent. They raise the cash, but problems later appear when Gavin reveals to Michael's fiancée Gail McIntyre (Helen Worth) that Andy has been lying. Gail becomes embroiled in Andy and Steph's deceit and they are later informed that the real Gavin has died in a car accident. When the lies become too much for Steph and realises that Andy is mainly looking out for himself, she ends their relationship. Later on, when she believes that Andy is leaving Weatherfield, Steph frantically tries to contact him but he turns up at her flat and the pair reconcile.

It was announced on 6 August 2015 that James Atherton had been filming with Coronation Street as the ex-boyfriend of Steph, Jamie. A storyline was then teased as something to affect both Steph and Luke. On 1 October, it was announced that Steph would be involved in a new "shocking" storyline. The storyline saw Jamie manipulate Luke by posting intimate pictures of Steph online, a real-life issue called revenge porn. The storyline began when Luke's girlfriend Maria Connor (Samia Ghadie) puts a stop to his and Jamie's racing car scheme and Luke agrees, angering Jamie. He then takes action and posts the pictures online, which leaves a "devastating effect" on Steph, with her "emotional turmoil set to shock viewers". Coronation Street bosses aimed to reflect that the issue, that was made illegal in early 2015, is still a "ongoing issue in wider society". Jamie was eventually arrested for the revenge porn.

Steph and Andy later move in together and are still together at the start of 2017 whilst Andy has attacked Pat Phelan (Connor McIntyre) in December 2016 for being present at the death of Michael in November. However, in January 2017, Andy admits to Steph that Phelan is blackmailing him and that he has forced him to set Kevin Webster's (Michael Le Vell) garage on fire. He also admits that Phelan has been threatening to harm Steph if he does not co-operate. She and Andy plan to leave for Portugal together to live with Katy, but at the airport he leaves as he has evidence of Phelan admitting to being present when Michael died. However, Phelan supposedly bludgeons Andy to death with the laptop containing the evidence. Phelan then texts Steph on Andy's mobile phone, breaking up with her and Steph leaves for Portugal alone, never knowing Andy's fate. In August 2017, it is shown Andy wasn't killed but has been kept hostage by Phelan. Luke later figures this out in January 2018 and is murdered by Phelan. Steph returns to the street later that month for Luke's funeral and argues with Phelan over him blackmailing Andy. She leaves again the following week.

Eric Babbage

Eric Babbage, played by Timothy West, made his first screen appearance on 18 February 2013. The character and West's casting was announced on 18 December 2012. When asked if he had always been interested in appearing in Coronation Street, West replied "Well I thought 'if Ian McKellen can do it then it's good enough for me!" The actor went on to reveal that the role of Eric appealed to him, as he could not stay long term and the story had "a definite end to it".

Marion McMullen from the Coventry Telegraph reported that Eric is a carpet salesman, who will be introduced as Gloria Price's (Sue Johnston) new love interest. West explained that Eric is a lonely man who works in a boring business. He has some money and wants to spend it by going on a round the world trip, with some company. Eric met Gloria on holiday and they got on well, but he has started to realise that she might not be all that she seems. When Eric meets Gloria's family, he finds himself drawn to her granddaughter, Eva (Catherine Tyldesley), because she is unhappy. West said: "He doesn't want to have a sexual relationship with her at all, he is far too old for one thing. But he does think that they might have some fun together seeing the world. She is funny and intelligent. He sees vulnerability in her that others don't, he doesn't really see the harder side of her." Eric offers to take Eva around the world, as he feels that it would benefit the both of them. Eric becomes "something of a father figure" to Eva and she is devastated when he later dies.

Gloria starts planning a lavish funeral for Eric, assuming that he has left her something in his will. Unfortunately, his solicitor arrives with Eric's wife, Doris, and reveals that not only had they never divorced but she would inherit everything as Eric hadn't changed his will. Doris refused to take over the funeral, threatening a pauper's funeral, so Eva shames Gloria into downgrading the plan slightly so they could pay for it between them. Eva sold a necklace that Eric gave her and Gloria sold her engagement ring so they could give him the send-off they felt he deserved.

Sinead Tinker 

Sinead Osbourne (also Tinker ) played by Katie McGlynn, made her first screen appearance on 19 April 2013. The character and casting was announced on 22 February 2013. Sinead is the niece of established character Beth Tinker (Lisa George). A writer for the serial's official website revealed that Sinead might catch Chesney Brown's (Sam Aston) eye following her arrival. The writer stated "Will new girl Sinead be his light at the end of the tunnel?" In July 2019, it was announced that Sinead would die from cervical cancer, due to McGlynn leaving Coronation Street. She died on 25 October 2019.

Sinead's aunt, Beth, contacts her and asks her to come to Coronation Street for a visit. Beth tries to set Sinead up with Chesney, who has recently broken up with his girlfriend, Katy Armstrong (Georgia May Foote). The pair really hit it off and Sinead agrees to go on another date with Chesney, but when Katy and her lover Ryan Connor (Sol Heras) arrive, Sinead feels that Chesney is using her to get back at Katy. When Katy moves in with Ryan and his family, Chesney acts like he could not care less, but Sinead can see that he is hurt by Katy's actions. Sinead sees through Chesney and realises that he is using her to get back at Katy, which infuriates her. After a talk with her aunt Beth, Sinead understands that she can't let Chesney use her. When Katy and Ryan ask Chesney and Sinead to look after Katy and Chesney's baby son, Joseph, Chesney tells them that they are going out for the night so they can't. But when the couple return home, Chesney reveals that they are not going out, which angers Sinead. They eventually do, with Beth and Kirk, but leave early as Sinead realises that Chesney does not want to be out. She argues with Chesney in the street, and later clashes with Katy, after she tries to give her boyfriend advice. During a date night, Sinead suggests to Chesney that they have sex, but Chesney turns her down. When Chesney reveals that he does not love her, Sinead says she understands. She stays overnight in Chesney's bed, while he sleeps on the sofa. Unhappy with the relationship, Sinead ends it and leaves. When Katy begs Chesney for another chance, Chesney rejects her and calls Sinead. She asks Chesney not to mess her about and they reunite. Sinead is very supportive when Chesney is told that his foster carer Hayley Cropper (Julie Hesmondhalgh) is dying from incurable pancreatic cancer. Sinead also attends Hayley's husband, Roy's (David Neilson), birthday party with Chesney. Sinead gets a job working at Underworld after helping Beth to win an Employee of the Month competition.

It was announced on 30 October 2014 that Coronation Street would air a mini-bus crash, involving the members of Underworld – including Sinead, after Steve McDonald (Simon Gregson) crashes the bus. A show spokesperson commented: "Exact details are being kept under wraps, but more than one character will be hospitalised as a result of the crash and one Underworld knicker stitcher's life will be on the line! Locations for the smash are currently being explored to find a suitably dramatic setting for what promises to be a high octane start to 2015 for Corrie fans." The scenes were filmed on 19 November 2014. The show released more information on the crash aftermath in January 2015. It was revealed that Sinead would be left worst from the crash, with "devastating" effects for her and Chesney. Producer, Stuart Blackburn, said that Sinead would be injured very seriously and that they would be "heartbreaking" scenes airing, "I have been watching some early scenes that have been shot of Katie McGlynn, who plays Sinead, and Sam Aston, who plays Chesney. It is just truly, truly heartbreaking. They have a long way to go. We all know how forgiving Sinead is, but I don't think Chesney is ever going to stop blaming Steve for that." McGlynn later spoke to Digital Spy, revealing Sinead's recovery is a long process and that she will be left wondering if she will walk again.

It was revealed on 6 January 2015 that former Hollyoaks star, Peter Mitchell, would be starring in Coronation Street as a character that one established character – revealed to be Sinead – would meet after the bus crash. Mitchell is disabled and it was thought Sinead would be involved with him after she is made paralysed. Mitchell later spoke to Digital Spy about his new role as patient Sam, who would become friends with Sinead, revealing that he would become an "ally" for Sinead when she is left paralysed. He also praised McGlynn and Aston and commented that they are "brilliant" to work alongside. Sinead's storyline played out onscreen from January until April 2015, with her back to her previous self by May.

In 2016, Sinead starts modelling which is met with criticism by Chesney. In January 2017, Sinead grows bored of Chesney and begins sleeping with Daniel Osbourne (Rob Mallard). Chesney finds out and breaks up with her leading to her moving in with Daniel. After finding out she is pregnant Daniel turns down his Oxford university application causing Daniel's father Ken Barlow's (William Roache) to turn on Sinead which prompts her to have a secret abortion. Due to this Sinead was a major suspect (which was later revealed to be Daniel) in the "Who Attacked Ken?" storyline. Daniel later finds out about this and they split up with Sinead later getting back with Chesney who she becomes engaged to, however they split on their wedding day after Chesney tells Sinead he does not love her and that he feels like he is just marrying her for a mother for his son Joseph who returned in October after his real mother Katy died in a car accident. Sinead visits Daniel's flat in just lingerie and they have sex, getting back together again. She later gets pregnant and gets engaged to Daniel. However, she starts bleeding, goes for a baby scan and is told she may have cervical cancer, which she does not tell Daniel about. Daniel arranges for them to have a pagan wedding with Kirk officiating. Sinead is then diagnosed with an aggressive form of cervical cancer and is told she will have to terminate her pregnancy if she wants to have radiotherapy. After being told this Sinead says she doesn't want radiotherapy as she wants to keep her baby and breaks down in hospital. She confides in Ken about the cancer after he sees her in hospital.

Jake Windass

Jake Windass played by Harley and Layton Phoenix from 2013 to 2015, Seth and Theo Wild from 2016 to 2018, and Bobby Bradshaw since August 2018, is the son of Gary Windass (Mikey North) and Izzy Armstrong (Cherylee Houston). He made his first screen appearance on 27 May 2013. On 23 April 2013, Peter Dyke and Katie Begley from the Daily Star reported that Tina McIntyre (Michelle Keegan), who was acting as Gary and Izzy's surrogate, would give birth to a boy two months early in The Rovers. Gary and Izzy decide to name the baby Jake. Their son is forced to stay in hospital because of his small size.
	
After suffering a miscarriage, Izzy approaches her sister Katy (Georgia May Foote) to carry a baby for her, as Izzy worries that, because of her disability, the pregnancy will be a struggle for herself and the baby. As the plans progress, Katy backs out and Tina offers to be their surrogate instead, after Izzy's father Owen Armstrong (Ian Puleston-Davies) offers to pay her for doing so. During the pregnancy, Izzy feels left out, while Gary became infatuated with Tina and tries to kiss her. When Tina eventually tells Izzy what happened, the resulting argument and stress causes Tina goes into labour two months early. She gives birth to a boy in May 2013, with Izzy and her ex-boyfriend Tommy Duckworth (Chris Fountain) by her side. Gary and Izzy decide to name their son Jake. Jake develops an infection in his intestine and undergoes surgery, which is successful. Tina later announces that she is keeping Jake and decides to rename him Joe, after her father Joe McIntyre. When Izzy decides to give up the fight for Jake, Tina realises how much she and Gary love him. She then gives Jake back to them.

Lily Platt

Lily Platt is the daughter of David (Jack P. Shepherd) and Kylie Platt (Paula Lane), played by twins Ava and Lily from 2013 to 2014, Betsie and Emmie Taylor from 2014 to 2016 and Brooke Malonie since June 2016. She made her first onscreen appearance on 26 August 2013. That same month, actress Michelle Keegan, who played Tina McIntyre, accidentally posted copies of a future script, which revealed Lily's father to be David. Lane said she was enjoying working with the babies who play Lily, calling them "lovely". She explained "They're still really small so you've got to be really careful with them, because they're so delicate. But they're very well-behaved and one of the babies actually had a close-up shot the other day where she suddenly opened her eyes. I think we've got a natural there."

Kylie has a one-night stand with David's brother Nick Tilsley (Ben Price) on Christmas Day 2012. She finds out she is pregnant in January 2013 and is unsure whether the father is Nick or David. David later discovers Kylie and Nick's fling after overhearing Kylie talk about the affair to his mother Gail McIntyre (Helen Worth) and realises that the baby may not be his. In August 2013, Kylie goes into labour at home and is found by Sean Tully (Antony Cotton). Gail arrives and helps Kylie deliver a daughter, who is named Lily. Nick is in hospital in a coma, after being injured in a van accident caused by David, at the time of Lily's birth. After Nick regains consciousness and finds out about the birth and wanting to know whether or not he is father, he tells David to get a DNA test on Lily. David is relieved when the test results reveal that Lily is his daughter. In November 2013, on the day of Lily's christening, David's responsibility for Nick's accident and the previous hate campaign against him, are revealed and Kylie tells David to stay away from Lily. Kylie then decides to raise Lily by herself with Gail's help.

In January 2014, Kylie gets drunk and falls asleep whilst cooking, putting her son Max Turner (Harry McDermott) and Lily at risk. David breaks into the house and turns the oven off. He rows with Kylie for putting Max and Lily's lives at risk but comforts her when she breaks down in tears, but they make amends. David throws Kylie out on Christmas Day 2014 when he discovers that she has been taking drugs. Kylie returns in May 2015 and eventually reconciles with David. In July 2016, Kylie is stabbed and killed while defending her friend Gemma Winter (Dolly-Rose Campbell) and David tells Max and Lily that Kylie has died. In October 2016, David, determined to get revenge on Kylie's killer Clayton Hibbs (Callum Harrison), plans to kill himself and Clayton and leaves Max and Lily a suicide video message. David escapes from the Bistro's cellar after being locked in by Gail, Nick and his sister Sarah Platt (Tina O'Brien) to prevent him going through with his plans. David almost hits Lily in his car and she and Gary Windass (Mikey North) are trapped by David's car when it flips. The residents work together and lift the car and free Gary and Lily.

Grace Piper

Grace Piper, played by Ella-Grace Gregoire, made her first screen appearance on 13 September 2013. The character and casting was announced on 22 August 2013. Gregoire successfully auditioned for the role after she was talent spotted at the Scream Theatre School in Blackpool. Of her casting, Gregoire commented "I couldn't believe it when I got the part. Now I am mixing with all the other actors who I have been watching for years."

Grace is introduced as a friend of Faye Windass (Ellie Leach). She was described as a "troublesome teenager" by David Sharman from the Blackpool Gazette, while a writer for the Scream Theatre School called her "manipulative" and said she would cause "mayhem". A Coronation Street spokesperson stated that Grace would come across as being lovely at first, but she soon wraps the adults round her finger and starts causing trouble. Faye's mother, Anna Windass (Debbie Rush), is "instantly wary" of Grace and believes she is up to no good. The spokesperson added that it is not long before Grace gets Faye into trouble.

Grace is first seen at Faye's house. Despite coming across as charming and polite, she later tells Faye she will be able to get what she wants by being nice to Anna. When Faye tells her she doesn't like her father Tim Metcalfe's (Joe Duttine) girlfriend, Sally Webster (Sally Dynevor), she steals £5 to make it look like Sally has not paid Anna at the café. She later puts the money back and tells Anna she saw Sally drop the money, forcing Sally to apologise. Grace continues to cause trouble for Sally when she tells Faye to tell her dad that she left them on their own, despite the fact that she was the one who asked Sally to get them some sweets. This results in an argument between Sally and Tim.

Although Grace continues to charm Anna, Owen Armstrong (Ian Puleston-Davies) and Sally begin to suspect that she is a bad influence on Faye. Their fears are confirmed when Grace and Faye throw stones at Mary Taylor's (Patti Clare) motor home. The two girls deny the incident, although Owen assures Mary he knows what is going on. Grace then manipulates Faye into throwing a Halloween party and uses the opportunity to annoy Nick Tilsley (Ben Price) by turning up the music. Nick, who had recently suffered brain damage, ends up shouting and having a breakdown. Grace then convinces Faye to again throw stones at Mary's camper van.

When Tracy Barlow (Kate Ford) asks Faye to walk her dog, Grace uses the situation to bully Simon Barlow (Alex Bain). After smashing a pot at the house, she then tells Faye to put Simon into one of Amy Barlow's dresses and films it. She then threatens Amy and Simon not to tell anybody what has happened, although Simon tells his stepmother Leanne Tilsley (Jane Danson). Although Faye and Grace deny any wrongdoing, a video late emerges and both girls are reported to the police. Grace's mother remains uninterested after hearing about what has happened, and blames Faye. At the police station, Faye finally admits Grace was the one who was in control of the situation and she has been threatening her to misbehave. Grace is later seen at the police station with her mother.

Valerie Phelan

Valerie Phelan, played by Caroline Berry, first appeared on 2 October 2013 and made her last appearance on 4 April 2014.

She is a nail technician and the wife of Pat Phelan (Connor McIntyre), who assumes control of his assets due to her husband's apparent issue with bankruptcy. Valerie is aware of Phelan's infidelity and yet she continues to remain with her husband and support him. This is first evident when Valerie receives an unexpected visit from Phelan's old acquaintance, Owen Armstrong (Ian Puleston-Davies) – who is looking to find Phelan in order to claim payment for work he had done for him. However, Valerie refuses to divulge Phelan's whereabouts and reveals Owen's situation. Owen then steals Phelan's motorcycle in retaliation and Phelan pays up. He later plots revenge and forges a business partnership with Owen for a flat conversion project, up to the point where Valerie joins her husband in spending quality time with Owen and his soon-to-be-stepfamily that consist of his lover Anna Windass (Debbie Rush).

During that time, Valerie is unaware of Phelan's plan and is kept in the dark when his attempt to rape Anna leads to a conversation with her son Gary (Mikey North) – who ends up knocking Phelan unconscious with a plank of wood. Later on, Valerie confronts Owen and Gary to demand Phelan's whereabouts upon finding out that he missed their special wedding anniversary plans – though neither claim to know where he is. After it transpires that Phelan had survived the confrontation, he proceeds to blackmail Owen and Gary into working for him under no payment by threatening to report Gary's assault on him – which CCTV footage had caught – to the police. Anna later invites Valerie to her house to explain the situation that her son and lover are going through with Phelan. However, Valerie refuses to believe Anna over Phelan and is promptly kicked out of her house. This is the last time she appears, as she is never seen again from then onwards. It is later implied, however, that Valerie had discovered Phelan's plan and how in contributed to what he did to Anna; blackmailing her into sleeping with him in exchange for Owen and Gary being released from his contract. Phelan confirms this by telling Anna how Valerie divorced him and kept all of his assets, thus leaving him penniless.

Pat Phelan

Pat Phelan, played by Connor McIntyre, is an illegitimate businessman and career con-artist who would later become the landlord of Weatherfield throughout his two-stint duration on the show. He debuted on 2 October 2013 and originally left the series on 14 April 2014, before returning as the show's primary antagonist until the character was killed off on 1 June 2018.

During his time on the programme, Phelan develops a longstanding rivalry with established characters Anna Windass (Debbie Rush) and her son Gary (Mikey North) after he blackmailed the pair in the midst of forging his business partnership with Anna's boyfriend and Gary's employer Owen Armstrong (Ian Puleston-Davies). This occurred after Phelan, seeking revenge against Owen for stealing his back in a bid to have Phelan repay the £4,000 he owed him, tricked Gary into attacking him on CCTV footage; extracted Owen's £80,000 investment before arranging for him to be removed from the council's contractors list of approved builders; and raped Anna by coercing her into sleeping with him in exchanging for relinquishing his blackmailing of Owen and Gary in retaliation for the latter's assault incident. This ultimately sparked the end of Phelan's marriage with his first wife Valerie (Caroline Berry), though he later marries Anna and Gary's next-door neighbour Eileen Grimshaw (Sue Cleaver).

The character proceeded to manipulate Eileen's son Jason (Ryan Thomas) into leaving the street after sabotaging his business empire; used Jason's inheritance from his late father, Tony Stewart (Terence Maynard), to set-up his fraudulent properly scheme called "Calcutta Street"; defrauded Gary's girlfriend Sarah Platt (Tina O'Brien) and most of their fellow residents, including local shopkeeper Rita Sullivan (Barbara Knox) and her friend Yasmeen Nazir (Shelley King), into investing their own money onto his properly scam; caused the death of his love rival Michael Rodwell (Les Dennis) by watching him die of a heart attack without providing help; locked Michael's surrogate son, Andy Carver (Oliver Farnworth), in a cellar for ten months after blackmailing the latter and appearing to have killed Andy on his own wedding day; became a prime suspect of causing the series' longest-serving character, Ken Barlow (William Roache), to fall down the stairs; reconciled with his long-lost daughter, Nicola Rubinstein (Nicola Thorp), until she discovers that he allegedly raped her mother Annabel just nine months before she herself was born; kidnapped his ex-partner-in-crime Vinny Ashford (Ian Kelsey) and forced Andy to murder him with a gun, before shooting Andy dead himself; killed Andy's best friend Luke Britton (Dean Fagan) from growing unknowingly close to uncovering his friend's fate; forced Andy's girlfriend and Luke's sister Steph (Tisha Merry) into absconding Weatherfield so he cover-up his murders; and framed Anna for pushing his apprentice Seb Franklin (Harry Visinoni) off a ladder in retribution for turning Nicola against him, which resulted in her four-month imprisonment.

Eventually, Phelan's crimes were exposed on 30 March 2018 after Eileen receives information about this from her work colleague Tim Metcalfe (Joe Duttine) during the couple's holiday. This subsequently led to Eileen kicking Phelan to the sea after he attempts to snatch his getaway boat keys from her. Though he is later presumed dead in Weatherfield on the day his crimes become public knowledge, Phelan is revealed to have survived the fall on 2 April 2018; with the character recuperating from his injuries in a B&B in Ireland. He then returned for the end-of-May special episodes which were broadcast post-watershed and concluded his story arc, wherein Phelan attempted to flee Weatherfield with his grandson Zack on the day Andy's boss Robert Preston (Tristan Gemmill) was due to marry his fiancé and restaurant colleague Michelle Connor (Kym Marsh). This triggered a siege where Phelan ends up shooting both his daughter Nicola and then bride-to-be Michelle, shortly before Anna returns from her false imprisonment and mortally stabs her tormenting rapist to stop him from escaping once more. This ultimately concluded the character's story arc as Phelan thereupon died, while both Nicola and Michelle survive from their gunshot impacts, and his body is later taken away in a private ambulance.

Upon his return in 2016, Phelan has been conceived as one of the best villains in soap history.

Kal Nazir

Khalid "Kal" Nazir, played by Jimi Mistry, made his first screen appearance on 8 December 2013. The character and Mistry's casting was announced on 2 July 2013. The actor began filming his scenes in September. Of Mistry's casting, series producer Stuart Blackburn commented "I'm thrilled to welcome Jimi to Coronation Street. With credits that include East Is East, The Guru and Blood Diamond, getting him on board is a real coup. Jimi's character is going to have a swift impact on the lives of many in Weatherfield."

Khalid, better known as "Kal", was an old army friend of Gary Windass (Mikey North); who worked as a personal trainer. Daniel Kilkelly from Digital Spy reported that Kal will "set tongues wagging and pulses racing" when he arrives. The character has been called "charming" and "roguish". While his wandering eye may cause some upset with certain male residents.

On 17 March 2015, it was announced that Mistry would be leaving Coronation Street as part of a dramatic storyline later in the year. Of his exit, Mistry stated "When I was told about this storyline I felt it was a brilliant way to say goodbye to Kal and I am really looking forward to filming my departure scenes. I have had a fantastic 18 months on Coronation Street but I never saw myself staying around forever, my life is in London and I enjoy playing a variety of roles." Kal died in a fire at the Victoria Court flats on 28 May 2015, with Mistry describing his final scenes as "fantastic", "I was really pleased when I got the scripts because it's the biggest fire the show has had. It's a very busy week on TV for it as well – it will get some good viewing figures hopefully!" Mistry also said how he has enjoyed himself in his time on the show, "I've said on record before that the Corrie family is a very special one. Everyone makes you feel welcome. It's a really good feeling and a really good atmosphere. It's just great working there. They've got a really good ship going – really tight and they're producing some great work." The episode was watched by 8.4 million viewers on the night of its broadcast, the highest rating the show had seen since the minibus crash in January 2015 as well as the most-watched programme of that day. The Victoria Court fire and the twist that saw Kal and Maddie Heath (Amy James-Kelly) die received a nomination on the Inside Soap Awards 2015 longlist, with the latter receiving a nomination on the shortlist as well.

It was announced that Kal's death would result in a child-parent violence storyline between Leanne and her stepson Simon Barlow (Alex Bain) as Simon begins being violent towards Leanne. Producer Stuart Blackburn said: "Simon's been through so much, with losing Kal, it's another male figure in his life who's gone. Simon is going to take it really, really hard." Blackburn also revealed that Kal's family would not be leaving following his exit and that they would continue appearing. Sair Khan (who plays Kal's daughter Alya) revealed that Alya would "lose control" and not cope following Kal's death, "I think the grief is too much for Alya, so she doesn't deal with it in the way she expects to. She can't be there for her family in the way that she wants to be there."

When Gary hears Dev Alahan (Jimmi Harkishin) complaining about being unfit, he tells him about his friend Kal, who is a personal trainer. Although Dev rejects the idea, Gary arranges a meeting with Kal anyway. After talking things over, Dev accepts Kal's help. Kal tells Dev that he also has two children and that his wife has died. Kal meets Nick Tilsley (Ben Price) in the bistro and offers to help him get into shape after his recent brain injury. Nick angrily rejects Kal's offer, but later asks for his help and Kal agrees to take him on. Kal and Dev discuss the idea of opening a gym and later look at a property on Victoria Street. It also becomes clear that Stella fancies Kal, although Dev also expresses an interest in her.

Kal begins to develop feelings for Leanne (Jane Danson), Nick's wife from whom he is separated, who initially turns down his advances as she believes that starting a relationship would hurt Nick, especially in his mental state. Kal's father Sharif (Marc Anwar) notices Kal's feelings for Leanne and quizzes her sister Eva (Catherine Tyldesley), who reveals to him that Leanne is an ex-prostitute. Sharif warns Kal that he should not move on quickly, for the sake of his children, who are still grieving over their deceased mother. Kal denies that he has any feelings for Leanne. Leanne's feelings for Kal grow over time, with them kissing after he steps in as a topless waiter in the Bistro. However, Nick professes to Leanne that he still loves her and later hugs her in the street, which Kal sees. Soon after, in the gym, Nick tells Kal that Leanne has given him another chance, leaving him devastated. However, in the Bistro, Leanne tells Kal that she only said she would give him another chance because she felt it would break his heart if she didn't. Sharif double-books Nick and Steve (Simon Gregson), who is training for a charity fun run, so Nick and Steve decide to train with Kal together. Overcome with jealousy, Kal begins to overwork Nick. Whilst boxing with pads as part of their training, Kal pushes Nick so hard that he loses his temper, shouts at him and inadvertently punches Steve in the face. He later apologises to Nick's mother Gail, who is furious with Kal as being pushed to the limit will make Nick's mental state deteriorate again. Nick asks Leanne to have dinner with him at the Bistro on their night out to test new food. But, worried that Nick will get the wrong idea, Leanne asks Eva to come as well. Nick, still unaware that he fancies Leanne, asks Kal to the dinner as well. After the dinner, Kal goes to Leanne's flat where they kiss. When Tina is found on the street after her attempted murder, Leanne tells Nick that she was alone. But later, Kal mentions to Nick that he was with Leanne and so Nick asks if they are seeing each other. Kal tells him that they are. Nick is livid and later storms round to Leanne and Eva's flat to tell Leanne that she is sacked from the Bistro.

In 2015, Kal gives Simon Barlow advice on asking a girl for a dance at a wedding. Sometime later, Kal and Leanne save Amy Barlow from a fire at Victoria Court. Kal proposes to Leanne at the last minute and she accepts, moments before he dies in an explosion.

Ritchie de Vries
 
Ritchie de Vries, real name Rodney Purvis, played by Robin Askwith, made his first screen appearance on 11 December 2013. The character and Askwith's casting was announced on 30 September 2013. The actor began filming his first scenes the day of the casting announcement. Ritchie is a "veteran rocker" and close friend of Dennis Tanner (Philip Lowrie). Dennis used to represent Ritchie "at the height of his fame". When Dennis meets up with Ritchie, he realises how much he loved the music industry and decides to become Ritchie's manager again. However, it soon becomes clear that the business arrangement means nothing to Ritchie, who starts to treat Dennis as more of a roadie.

Andrea Beckett

Andrea Beckett, played by Hayley Tamaddon, made her first screen appearance on 23 December 2013. The character and Tamaddon's casting was announced on 4 October 2013. Series producer, Stuart Blackburn, commented "I'm absolutely delighted to welcome Hayley to the show. She's a great actress who I know is going to bring plenty of drama to the famous cobbles of Weatherfield." Andrea is a classmate of Steve McDonald's (Simon Gregson), who decides to go back to school. Andrea and Steve become friends and she will "cause a stir" as Steve's girlfriend Michelle Connor (Kym Marsh) becomes suspicious of their friendship. Tamaddon said Andrea is a ladette, who enjoys drinking beer and playing darts.

On 28 April 2015, it was announced that Tamaddon had been axed from the show, and would in September as part of the upcoming live episode to celebrate ITV's 60th anniversary. It was stated that the character not being killed off and could return. Speaking of her departure, Tamaddon said: "I came into Corrie for 3 months and have stayed for 2 years! I will be so sad to leave, I have had the best two years of my life here, it really is one big family. Everyone looks out for each other and I've made some incredible friends. I am excited about my exit storyline and the fact that it is part of the live episode." Show producer Stuart Blackburn commented: "Hayley has brought real magic to the Corrie cobbles – funny, energetic, totally professional and a joy to be around." It was announced days later that Craig Charles (who plays Andrea's partner Lloyd Mullaney) would also be leaving. The live episode heavily featured Lloyd and Andrea, as they said goodbye to the Street. Andrea and Lloyd made one further appearance on 25 September when they returned to say a final goodbye with Steve, who was unable to attend the party, leaving viewers in confusion as they had appeared to leave during the live episode. The live episode, including the leaving party, was watched by 8.1 million viewers on the night of its broadcast, the highest rating since the Victoria Court fire in May 2015. The episode in which Lloyd and Andrea say their final goodbye to Steve, was watched by 6.9 million viewers on the night of its broadcast.

Andrea is mentioned by Steve several times before her first appearance, causing anxiety to Michelle. When Andrea arrives at the Rovers, Michelle realises Steve has lied about her not being attractive and takes an instant dislike to her. After Steve gives Michelle her Christmas present, she later overhears Lloyd and Steve talking and learns Andrea helped Steve to choose it. Andrea tells Lloyd she has a teenage son, and he decides to ask her out. Steve refuses to give Lloyd her phone number, but Andrea overhears and gives Lloyd the number herself. When Steve finds out that Lloyd and Andrea have begun, he feels left out. Andrea thinks this gives her a chance of getting Steve in the future, unaware that he only sees her as a friend. She asks Steve to help him with a project, but when she asks Steve to sit closer so he can see her laptop screen, he wrongly believes she is coming on to him and she leaves. Steve later apologises they begin the project again. Whilst working on their project, Steve goes out to get kebabs and, on his return, he finds her asleep. A sleepy Andrea mistakes Steve for Lloyd and pulls him close to her, causing her to fall on him and cover them both in kebab, as Michelle enters.

Lloyd offers Andrea a meal at the Bistro one evening, but Andrea needs to be at home to welcome her husband Neil (William Travis), who is due to return from working on an oil rig in Nigeria. They agree to go for a meal earlier, but she gets angry when Lloyd tries to persuade her to stay, and storms out of the Bistro. Lloyd then leaves her a phone message, but she unplugs the phone as her husband returns and pretends it is broken to stop him finding out about Lloyd. Andrea confides in Michelle that she plans to split from Neil. |s Andrea dumps Neil and moves into Lloyd's with her luggage, he realises she was not serious about him and throws her bags out of the door. Steve consoles Andrea, causing Neil to think she was cheating with Steve. When he finds out that Andrea is in a relationship with Lloyd, Neil finds it difficult to accept and climbs onto the roof of the pub. Andrea puts herself in danger while trying to talk him down. Neil and Andrea after a while return to safety. Neil finally accepts that Andrea and Lloyd are in a relationship, but tells Andrea and Lloyd that he will not sever his ties with Andrea, because of Jess.

Andrea and Lloyd split and she departs, but returns pregnant. Eileen Grimshaw (Sue Cleaver), Steve and Lloyd's friend, is the first to find out. Lloyd is now dating Steve's mother, Liz McDonald (Beverley Callard), but ends things with Liz when Andrea returns and falls out with Steve. Andrea tells Lloyd she has been offered a job in Jersey, and they agree to go there. Steve and Lloyd make up when Michelle and Andrea lock them in the cellar. Steve is too drunk to join in the leaving party celebrations. After saying goodbye to Michelle, Liz and Eileen, Lloyd and Andrea leave and let go of balloons as the car drives off. They return a few days later in order to say goodbye to Steve.

Maddie Heath

Maddie Ivy Heath, played by Amy James-Kelly, made her first screen appearance on 25 December 2013. Maddie was introduced as a love interest for Sophie Webster (Brooke Vincent). Maddie is homeless and she and Sophie meet at a soup kitchen. Sophie's mother, Sally (Sally Dynevor), will "take an instant disliking" to Maddie. Vincent commented "Maddie shakes things up, she's very much a Kylie Platt or Becky McDonald character but a lot worse. She's very demanding and hard to read – you're intrigued by her. I think she's a good match for Sophie, who stands her ground with her." David Brown from the Radio Times praised the character, saying "It seems to me that Maddie is fast turning into this season's Becky Granger. Which isn't a bad thing – actress Amy Kelly does have the convincing feel of a Katherine Kelly about her." On 15 June 2014, it was revealed that Kelly had signed a new contract that would see her stay on the show for another year. Kelly was originally only meant to stay on the show for a short time, but following after the producers promise to keep Maddie on the show as long as he was executive producer, she was offered a longer stay.

Maddie is first seen at the homeless shelter on Christmas Day. After Sally makes a comment about her having bad manners, she pushes her face into a trifle. When Sally notices her handbag has gone missing, she blames Maddie, although she denies any knowledge of it. Sally is upset when she finds out her watch was left in her stolen handbag, and so Sophie asks Maddie for it back. Maddie asks for fifty pounds in response, but Sophie tricks her and refuses to pay her the money. Furious, Maddie breaks into the Webster's house and steals the watch back. When Sophie confronts her again, Maddie reveals her mother is mentally ill and she has a younger brother, Ben. Maddie later kisses Sophie. Sophie invites Maddie back to her house for dinner on her birthday, but she later leaves after Sally offends her.

Maddie is later offered a job at the local factory, Underworld, when the boss Carla Connor (Alison King) is impressed by Maddie's determination to save Deirdre Barlow's (Anne Kirkbride) missing dog, Eccles. Carla is furious, however, that Maddie and Sophie stole her brand new expensive car in order to do so. In early in the year.
Maddie accompanies the Underworld staff to an awards' ceremony, but a group of boy racers drive dangerously in front of the minibus, causing the driver Steve McDonald (Simon Gregson) to swerve and the vehicle to flip over dramatically and to balance precariously on the edge of a quarry. Maddie is one of the later people to regain consciousness, and helps free Tracy Barlow (Kate Ford), Michelle Connor (Kym Marsh) and Alya Nazir (Sair Khan) from the wreckage. She and Julie Carp (Katy Cavanagh) then re-enter the wreckage to save Sally, Sinead Tinker (Katie McGlynn) and Kirk Sutherland (Andrew Whyment). They are successful, and Maddie reveals to Julie that her middle name is Ivy in an attempt to take their minds off the traumatic situation. Maddie volunteers to go back into the wreckage again when the staff realise that Carla is still trapped inside, but it is Tracy who risks her life to save the factory boss. Carla is saved, but Tracy nearly dies when the minibus begins to slide off the edge of the quarry. Tracy leaps out at the last second.

Maddie is thrilled for Sophie's father, Kevin Webster (Michael Le Vell) when he begins a relationship with Jenny Bradley (Sally Ann Matthews). However, when Sophie learns about how Jenny conned her former foster mother Rita Tanner (Barbara Knox) when she lived in Weatherfield 21 years previously, she begins acting very cold towards Jenny. Maddie tries her best to understand Sophie's hatred towards Jenny, however she fails to and this puts a strain on their relationship. In May 2015, Maddie tries to help when a fire breaks out at the Victoria Court flats, and rushes back home to reveal the horrific events to Jenny. To her surprise, she witnesses Jenny wearing a wig and packing Kevin's young son Jack's belongings. She soon realises that Jenny is going to abduct Jack, and as she tries to call the police, Jenny violently pushes her to the floor, angrily demanding for Maddie to stay. Maddie knees Jenny in the stomach in order to escape, and rushes back over to the Victoria Court flats to tell Sophie that she was right all along about Jenny. However, as she passes through the police tape, an explosion at the building yard caused by a piece of burning wood from the fire occurs, sending Maddie flying across the street. Paramedics quickly respond, and it takes them a long time to find Maddie's pulse. A couple of days later, Maddie passes away with Sophie, Sally and Kevin by her side, to the secret relief of Jenny.

Others

References

External links
 Cast and characters at itv.com
 Cast and characters at the Internet Movie Database

2013
, Coronation Street
Coronation Street